R03 may refer to:

 AAA battery
 Alkali Lake State Airport in Lake County, Oregon
 ATC code R03, a subgroup of the Anatomical Therapeutic Chemical Classification System

See also
 R3 (disambiguation)